The Botswana Patriotic Front (BPF) is a populist and conservative liberal political party in Botswana formed in July 2019 by members of the Botswana Democratic Party who split from the party because of a high profile rivalry between former President Ian Khama and Mokgweetsi Masisi.

History
The party was officially launched in July 2019 as a split from the ruling Botswana Democratic Party (BDP). It was backed by former President and BDP leader Ian Khama after he left the party.

In the October 2019 general elections, the party received 4.3% of the vote and won three seats, all in Khama's home area of Central District – Tshekedi Khama II elected in Serowe West, Leepetswe Lesedi in Serowe South and Baratiwa Mathoothe in Serowe North. However, party leader Biggie Butale failed to be elected in Tati West.

The party suspended public activities in January 2021 due to the COVID-19 pandemic.

Election results

National Assembly

References

Political parties in Botswana
2019 establishments in Botswana
Political parties established in 2019